Tarbertia is a genus of fungi within the Arthoniales order. The genus has not been placed into a family. This is a monotypic genus, containing the single species Tarbertia juncina.

References

Arthoniomycetes
Monotypic Ascomycota genera
Lichen genera
Taxa described in 1974